Saemangeum is an estuarine tidal flat on the coast of the Yellow Sea in South Korea.  It was dammed by the government of South Korea's Saemangeum Seawall Project, completed on April 27, 2010, after a long fight between the government and environmental activists, and is scheduled to be converted into either agricultural or industrial land.  Prior to 2010, it had played an important role as a habitat for migratory birds. The completion of this seawall is likely to be a major contributor to the decline of many species. Around 400,000 shorebirds depended on the Saemangeum estuarine as an important feeding ground on the 24,000 km migration between Asia and Alaska and Russia, including the two endangered waders Nordmann's greenshank and spoon-billed sandpiper (each species with fewer than a thousand surviving birds). A conservation organisation has accused authorities of having failed to monitor the project's impact on local wildlife in a transparent way, and carried out an independent monitoring program in 2006.

The Saemangeum lay at the mouths of the Dongjin and Mangyeong Rivers, on the coast of Jeollabuk-do.  It is just south of the estuary of the Geum River.  Neighboring districts include Gunsan City, Buan County, and Gimje City.

The project of filling in the estuary began in 1991, but was slowed by a series of court actions by environmentalists.  The completed seawall is some 33 kilometers long, and replaces a coastline that was once more than 100 kilometers long.  After the estuary has been completely filled, an area of about 400 km2 (roughly two-thirds the size of Seoul) will have been added to the Korean peninsula, making it one of the biggest land reclamation projects in history.

The estuary was originally called "Mangeum" (萬金).  This name was probably formed from combining the first character of "Mangyeong" and that of "Gimje."

Saemanguem was completed on April 27, 2010, officially becoming the longest seawall ever built with the length of 33.9 km, breaking the record of Zuiderzee Works from 1932.

On August 2, 2010, Saemanguem was certified by Guinness World Records as the longest man-made sea barrier in the world.

Saemangum will be the venue of the 25th World Scout Jamboree, hosted by the Korea Scout Association.

See also
Environment of South Korea
Geography of South Korea
Rivers of South Korea
Saemangeum Seawall

References

Further reading
Moores, N.; Battley, P.; Rogers, D.; Park M-N; Sung H-C; Van de Kam, J.; & Gosbell, K. (2006). Birds Korea – AWSG Saemangeum Shorebird Monitoring Program Report, 2006. Birds Korea publication: Busan.

External links

Korea's government official website : Saemangeum Development and Investment Agency
Chosun Ilbo report on the completion of the seawall, 2006-04-21
Saemangeum reference page from Birds Korea
Korea Rural Community Corporation Saemangeum Website
Article in New York Review of Books  Mentions Saemangeum Seawall as prime example of bird habitat loss
「25th WorldScout Jamboree」 Official Site

 
Nature conservation in South Korea
Wetlands of South Korea
Landforms of North Jeolla Province
Yellow Sea
Internal territorial disputes of South Korea